Eat My Fuc is the second full-length studio album by controversial American punk rock musician GG Allin, recorded and released in 1984 on Blood Records. Although side one, the first five tracks, were recorded and released initially in 1983 as a single. This album, played with the backing band The Scumfucs, marks the era where his singing voice had not yet began to deteriorate from a high-pitched sneer into a husky growl, yet his lyrics began to include extreme sociopathic themes and shock value.

The original pressings had the record in a plain paper sleeve with similar black & white xeroxed cover art glued to it, the front of which had what GG claimed was an individually self-traced outline of Allin's erect penis on the cover.  Allin claimed in a video interview around this time (for his first home video release, Scumfuc Alley Trash, shot by Black & Blue Records co-owner Peter Yarmouth) that when he was handdrawing each front cover of this pressing, he had his then-girlfriend act as a fluffer to keep his penis erect for the drawings.

The subsequent re-release in 1989 by Black & Blue Records retitles the album, for front cover purposes, E.M.F., and does not mention The Scumfucs on the album cover (although they are clearly credited on the record label), nor does it list the song titles on the cover; the Black & Blue edition also adds 3 studio recordings "I'm Gonna Rape You", "I Wanna Fuck Your Brains Out" and "Teachers Pet" from a 1985 EP.  Both versions contained Live at the A7 Club track which was from an April 1983 performance by GG and the Jabbers to the end of side two of the album.

None of the members of The Scumfucs are individually identified on the album cover, nor are the Jabbers mentioned in the credits in conjunction with the live tracks.

The "Dick Urine" production credit on the album was alleged to be one Richard Yorun, an up-and-coming recording engineer and producer that had been given the Dick Urine pseudonym by Allin, and who had reportedly died in a motorcycle accident in Sweden while he was attempting to set up Black & Blue Records.  In reality, Richard Yorun never existed: the name, originally a GG Allin joke credit printed on some early cassette self-releases, is actually a collective pseudonym for Allin and Black & Blue Records owner Peter Yarmouth. It is believed that the title Eat My Fuc was inspired by a scene in the 1981 punk documentary The Decline of Western Civilization where bassist Derf Scratch of the band Fear shouts "eat my fuck asshole" at a member of the audience.

Track listing
"Hard Candy Cock"
"Out for Blood"
"I Don't Give a Shit"
"Drink, Fight, and Fuck"
"Convulsions"
"I Wanna Fuck Your Brains Out" (1989 reissue)
"I'm Gonna Rape You" (1989 reissue)
"Teacher's Pet" (1989 reissue)
"Fuckin' the Dog"
"Cock on the Loose"
"Clit Licker"
"God of Fire in Hell"
"Blow Jobs" ("She Got A Nose Job" Mad Magazine novelty song by Mike Russo, Jeanne Hayes, and The Dellwoods, new filthy lyrics by GG Allin)
 Live at the A7 Club 4/83 ("You Hate Me and I Hate You"/"No Rules")

References

External links
GG Allin discography

1983 albums
Black & Blue Records albums
GG Allin albums